The 2008 FC Spartak Moscow season was the club's 17th season in the Russian Premier League season. Spartak finished the season in 8th while progressing to the Quarterfinals of the 2008–09 Russian Cup which took place during the 2009 season. In Europe, Spartak were knocked out of the UEFA Champions League by Dynamo Kyiv at the Third Qualifying round before dropping into the 2008–09 UEFA Cup where they finished 4th in their group.

Season events
On 12 September, Spartak announced the appointment of Michael Laudrup as their new manager.

Squad

On loan

Left club during season

Transfers

In

Out

Loans out

Released

Competitions

Premier League

Results by round

Results

League table

Russian Cup

The Quartfinal took place during the 2009 season.

UEFA Champions League

Qualifying rounds

UEFA Cup

First round

Group stage

Squad statistics

Appearances and goals

|-
|colspan="16"|Players away from the club on loan:

|-
|colspan="16"|Players who appeared for Spartak Moscow but left during the season:

|}

Goal scorers

Clean sheets

Disciplinary record

References

FC Spartak Moscow seasons
Spartak Moscow